Bārbak is a masculine given name. Notable people with the name include:

 Ruknuddin Barbak Shah (r. 1459-1474), Sultan of Bengal 
 Shahzada Barbak (d. 1487), the first Abyssinian sultan of Bengal

References

Persian masculine given names